Protein Wnt-8a is a protein that in humans is encoded by the WNT8A gene.
Wnt8a may be involved in the development of early embryos as well as germ cell tumors.

Function 

The Wnt8a gene is part of the Wnt family of genes and plays a role in vertebrates in the process of axis patterning. Wnt8a encodes for 2 proteins, Wnt8a.1 and Wnt8a.2 via a complicated mechanism involving the coordination of signaling molecules to control up and down stream promoters. Furthermore, Wnt8a has shown to play a role in neural crest induction via Wnt/𝜷-catenin signaling based on experiments using zebrafish as a model organism. Wnt8a among other Wnt genes influence the Wnt/𝜷-catenin signaling in neural crest development. 𝜷-catenin is degraded in the absence of a Wnt signaling, but upon the binding of a Wnt ligand with a frizzled receptor and Lrp5/6 the 𝜷-catenin signaling molecule is no longer degraded. Instead, it interacts with transcription factors that activate Wnt expression, of which, Wnt8 is crucial for neural crest development and other cell fates. In a study of morpholino based gene knockdown in zebrafish, knocking down Wnt8a resulted in the lack of expression of various other genes important for neural crest induction (pax3, sox10, and foxd3). It is unclear however, if the loss of these neural crest specifiers is a result of Wnt8a directly in the induction process or is a downstream consequence of disruptions in Wnt8a signaling earlier in development. Regardless, the results of this study show Wnt8a as a key player in neural crest induction.

References